Mats Haakenstad (born 14 November 1993) is a Norwegian footballer who plays as right back who plays for Sandefjord.

Career statistics

Club

References

External links
Mats Haakenstad at NFF

1993 births
Living people
Norwegian footballers
Norwegian expatriate footballers
Eliteserien players
Norwegian First Division players
Veikkausliiga players
Kakkonen players
IF Fram Larvik players
Sandefjord Fotball players
Lillestrøm SK players
Kuopion Palloseura players
SC Kuopio Futis-98 players
Association football defenders
Norwegian expatriate sportspeople in Finland
Expatriate footballers in Finland
People from Horten
Sportspeople from Vestfold og Telemark